Iskandar, Iskander, Askander, Eskinder, or Scandar ( ( Eskandar or سکندر Skandar), is a variant of the given name Alexander in cultures such as Iran (Persia), Arabia and others throughout the Middle East, Caucasus and Central Asia. In Egypt, its bearers are mostly of Christian (Coptic) descent. Originally referring to Alexander the Great, it was transmitted through works such as the Iskandarnamah and the Sirr al-Asrar, and became a popular name for rulers in the medieval period. 

The Arabic version may also add the definite-article prefix al-, giving . 
al-Iskandarīyah ("of Alexander") is the Arabic name of the Egyptian city of Alexandria.

Given name

Iskandar
 Sultan Iskandar (disambiguation), names of several Muslim rulers who share the same title and name
 Iskandar-i Shaykhi (died 1403), ruler of the Afrasiyab dynasty from 1393 to 1403. He was the son and successor of Kiya Afrasiyab
 Iskandar (Timurid dynasty), ruler of Persia
 Iskandar Dzhalilov (born 1992), Tajikistani footballer
 Iskandar Ghanem (1911–2005), Lebanese army general 
 Iskandar Jalil (born 1940), Singaporean ceramist
 Iskandar Khatloni (1954–2000), Tajikistani journalist
 Iskandar Muda, sultan of Aceh 
 Iskandar bin Rahmat (born 1979), convicted murderer in Singapore
Iskandar Ramis (born 1946), vice governor of Bengkulu
 Iskandar Safa (born 1955), French businessman
 Eskandar Shora, Iranian boxer
 Iskandar Thani (1610–1641), sultan of Aceh

Iskander
 Iskander Hachicha (born 1972), Tunisian judoka
 Iskander Mirza (1899–1969), first President of the Republic of Pakistan

Eskandar
 Eskandar II (died 1359), ruler of the Paduspanid dynasty

Eskinder 

 Eskinder Nega (1969-), Ethiopian journalist.
 Eskinder Desta (Iskinder Desta) (1934–1974), member of the Ethiopian Imperial family and naval officer.
 Eskender Mustafaiev (1981-), Russian-Ukrainian paralympic swimmer. 
 Eskender (Kwestantinos II or Constantine II) (1471-1494), Emperor of Ethiopia.

Scandar
 Scandar Copti (born 1975), Palestinian Israeli filmmaker

Skandar
 Skandar Keynes (born 1991), English political advisor and former actor

Others
 Skanderbeg (1405–1468), 15th century war lord and national hero of Albania

Surname

Iskandar
 Affifa Iskandar (1921–2012), Iraqi singer
 Anang Iskandar (born 1956), Indonesian police officer
 Azri Iskandar, Malaysian actor
 Charbel Iskandar (born 1966), Lebanese actor
 Djoko Iskandar (born 1950), Indonesian zoologist
 Irawati Iskandar (born 1969), Indonesian tennis player
 Layla Iskandar (born 2002), Lebanese footballer
 Mohd Azlan Iskandar (born 1982), Malaysian squash player
 Muhaimin Iskandar (born 1966), Indonesian politician and government minister
 Noer Muhammad Iskandar (1955–2020), Indonesian Islamic cleric
 Nouri Iskandar (born 1938), Syrian musicologist and composer
 Nur Iskandar (born 1986), Indonesian footballer
 Samih Abdel Fattah Iskandar, Jordanian scout official
 Syaiful Iskandar (born 1985), Singaporean footballer

Iskander
 Amin Iskander (born 1952), Egyptian politician, writer and activist
 Fazil Iskander (1929–2016), Soviet Russian novelist
 Laila Iskander, Egyptian entrepreneur and politician
 Magda Iskander, Egyptian entrepreneur 
 Maryana Iskander (born 1975), CEO of the Wikimedia Foundation 
 Qara Iskander, ruler of the Kara Koyunlu 
 Willem Iskander (1840–1876), Indonesian writer, nationalist, teacher and educator

Military

 9K720 Iskander, a Russian missile system.

See also
İskender (disambiguation)
Skanderbeg (disambiguation)
Sikandar

References

Arabic masculine given names
Iranian masculine given names